Priscila Rezende (b. 1985) is a performance artist who lives and works in Belo Horizonte, Brazil. She received a degree in Visual Arts from Guignard-UEMG School in Belo Horizonte, specializing in Photography and Ceramics. Her work departs from her experiences as a Black woman to examine and challenge discourses of racism in Brazil. She explores the legacy of Transatlantic African slavery and plantation economies, as well as anti-black racism in beauty standards. In 2018, she was an artist in Residence at CMC/SESC at Central Saint Martins in London and at Art Omi in Ghent, New York. Though she primarily works through performance, she has also produced "Bargain" (2017), a video work. 

Her performance works include:

 Bombril (2010)
 Body (2011)
 Ties (2013)
 Purification I (2013)
 Purification II (2014)
 Purification III (2014)
 Deformation (2015)
 Genesis 9:25 (2015)
 Re-education (2016)
 Genesis 3:16 (2017)
 Come...to be unhappy (2017)
 Black Indices Exhibition (2017)
 November 29, 1781 (2018)
 £20m (2018)

References

External links 
 

Brazilian performance artists
Brazilian women artists
21st-century Brazilian artists
People from Belo Horizonte
1985 births
Living people